The Chucunaque River is a river of Panama.  It is a tributary of the Tuira River in the Darién Province.  It is the longest river in Panama.

See also
List of rivers of Panama

References
 Rand McNally, The New International Atlas, 1993.
CIA map, 1995.

Rivers of Panama